This is a list of Ultrabook models.

Huron River

Chief River

Shark Bay 

Notes:
* This component is upgradable.  That is, the manufacturer allows the user to customize/upgrade this component of the ultrabook at time of purchase to one of several better options for an increase in price. Some manufacturers or stores charge more, and will require wait time and/or home delivery for customized models. For more details on the available upgrades for a model, click on the references listed next to the model name.

References

Ultrabook models
Ultrabooks